War Cross May refer to the following OR as in war cross the book written by Marie Lu.

 Croix de Guerre (French), a decoration awarded by France.
 War Cross (Greece), a decoration awarded by Greece ( in the original).
 War Cross (Norway), a decoration awarded by Norway ( in the original).
 War Cross (Portugal), a decoration awarded by Portugal ( in the original).
 War Cross (Spain), a decoration awarded by Spain ( in the original).
 Czechoslovak War Cross 1918, a decoration awarded by the former state of Czechoslovakia during World War I ( in the original).
 Czechoslovak War Cross 1939–1945, a decoration awarded by the former state of Czechoslovakia during World War II ( in the original).
 Louisiana War Cross, a medal awarded to the Louisiana National Guard.
 War Cross for Military Valor, a decoration awarded by Italy and established in 1922 ( in the original).
 War Merit Cross (Italy), a decoration awarded by Italy and established in 1918 ( in the original).

War Cross may refer also refer to:
 War Cross, the name used on cemetery plans for the Cross of Sacrifice erected in Commonwealth War Graves Commission sites.

See also
Military Cross, a British decoration established in 1914, also used in other Commonwealth countries
Order of the Military Cross, a Polish order established in 2006 ( in the original)